Cerastium cerastoides, the mountain chickweed or starwort mouse-ear, is a flowering plant species in the pink family Caryophyllaceae found in the mountains of Europe.

References

External links

cerastoides
Flora of Europe
Plants described in 1753
Taxa named by Carl Linnaeus